Sinxema is a genus of moths belonging to the family Tortricidae.

Species
Sinxema chapada Razowski & Becker, 2003
Sinxema xenisma Razowski & Becker, 2003

See also
List of Tortricidae genera

References

 , 2003: Descriptions of three South American genera of Euliini and five their species (Lepidoptera Tortricidae). Bollettino di Zoologia Agraria e di Bachicoltura. (2) 35 (1): 23–29.

External links
tortricidae.com

Euliini
Tortricidae genera